The 1997 IAAF World Race Walking Cup was held on 19 and 20 April 1997 in the streets of Poděbrady, Czech Republic. The course followed a loop around Lázeňský park.

Detailed reports on the event and an appraisal of the results was given for the IAAF.

Complete results were published.

Medallists

Results

Men's 20 km

Team (20 km Men)
The list below as published in the source might not be corrected in respect to the doping disqualification.

Men's 50 km

Team (50 km Men)

Lugano Trophy (Combined Team Men)
The results list as published in the source contains some obvious errors that were tentatively corrected.  Moreover, there are inconsistencies when summing up the points of the 20 km and 50 km team results and the results list as published in the source.  It is speculated that the 20 km team results might not be corrected in respect to the doping disqualification.

Women's 10 km

Team (Women)

Participation
The participation of 365 athletes (248 men/117 women) from 47 countries is reported.

 (9/5)
 (4/-)
 (9/5)
 (3/-)
 (-/1)
 (4/-)
 (2/3)
 (7/5)
 (10/5)
 (4/-)
 (1/-)
 (1/1)
 (3/-)
 (3/5)
 (10/5)
 (7/4)
 (5/1)
 (7/-)
 (9/5)
 (10/5)
 (1/3)
 (4/3)
 (4/3)
 (5/4)
 (1/-)
 (4/4)
 (10/5)
 (5/-)
 (1/-)
 (3/3)
 (1/-)
 (3/-)
 (8/3)
 (9/4)
 (1/-)
 (-/2)
 (10/5)
 (10/5)
 (5/-)
 (10/5)
 (7/-)
 (6/-)
 (1/1)
 (10/4)
 (8/4)
 (10/5)
 Yugoslavia (3/3)

See also
 1997 Race Walking Year Ranking

References

External links
Official IAAF website for the 1997 IAAF World Race Walking Cup
IAAF World Race Walking Cup 1961-2006 Facts & Figures - IAAF.org

World Athletics Race Walking Team Championships
World Race Walking Cup
World Race Walking Cup
World Race Walking Cup